Melahat Eryurt, (October 27, 1975 in Hannover, West Germany), is a Turkish female footballer. A member of the Turkey women's national football team, she is the most capped player with 39 matches and the top scorer with 18 goals, as of March 2010.

Clubs played
 Acarlarspor (1995)
 Dinarsuspor, Istanbul (1997) 
 Marshall Boyaspor, Istanbul (1999-2001)
 Zeytinburnuspor, Zeytinburnu-Istanbul (2001)
 Yalıspor, Maltepe-Istanbul (2002)
 Kuzeyspor, Bostancı-Istanbul (2002)

References

Turkish women's footballers
1975 births
Footballers from Hanover
Dinarsuspor players
Turkey women's international footballers
Living people
Women's association football forwards
20th-century Turkish sportswomen
21st-century Turkish sportswomen